Michael Moe Myint is a Burmese business tycoon, who founded and runs 2 major companies in the country's petroleum industry, Myint & Associates, a service provider and MPRL E&P, a gas extraction company.

He was educated at the Methodist English High School (now Dagon1 High School) in Yangon, then at International School Bangkok, University of Rangoon and Marshall University, before returning to Burma. From 1974 to 1987, he served as a pilot for the state-owned Myanma Airways, and served as the personal pilot of Ne Win.

Two years later, in 1989, he founded Myint & Associates. In 1996, he established his own oil exploration and excavation company, Myanmar Petroleum Resources Limited (MPRL).

Family
His two sons, Sithu Moe Myint and Phone Kyaw Moe Myint, both studied at the Colorado School of Mines, and work for multinational oil firms. His father worked as geologist for Shell.

References

Burmese businesspeople
University of Yangon alumni
Marshall University alumni
1952 births
People from Yangon
Living people